Marshal Admiral Viscount  was a career naval officer and admiral in the Imperial Japanese Navy during Meiji-period Japan.

Biography

Born in what is now part of Kagoshima city, as the son of a samurai retainer of the Satsuma Domain, Inoue took part in the Anglo-Satsuma War as a youth. Although severely injured by shrapnel through his left thigh during the fighting, he was extremely impressed with the firepower of the Royal Navy and the amount of material damage that only a few vessels were able to inflict on Kagoshima. On recovery, he enlisted in the Satsuma Navy, and he was present at all of the major naval engagements associated with the Boshin War to overthrow the Tokugawa Shogunate as commander of the Satsuma warship .
 

Inoue was a supporter of Saigō Takamori and his Seikanron position vis-a-vis Korea. At the time of the Ganghwa Island incident (1875), Inoue was captain of the gunboat  and played a key role in the events which led to the opening of Korea to foreign trade and diplomatic relations.  Inoue then was assigned to the new corvette  of which he was the chief equipping officer in charge of overseeing her construction. Seiki was the first domestically-produced Japanese warship.

Despite his admiration for Saigō and some concerns that he might defect with the Seiki, Inoue remained loyal to the Meiji government against his former Satsuma clansmen during the Satsuma Rebellion. In October 1877, Inoue was assigned to take Seiki on a voyage to Europe and back. Seiki passed through the Suez Canal, and made a port call at Constantinople, where Inoue was received in an audience by the Ottoman Sultan, and eventually reached London. The voyage was hailed in the foreign press as a major achievement for Japan.

Inoue was promoted to commander in June 1882 and to rear admiral on 15 June 1886, and appointed Director of the Bureau of Naval Affairs shortly thereafter. He was ennobled with the title of danshaku (baron) under the kazoku peerage system on 24 May 1887.

Inoue became first commandant of the Imperial Japanese Naval Academy on 16 August 1888. He became Commander-in-Chief of the Readiness Fleet on 29 July 1889, and vice admiral and commander-in-chief of the Sasebo Naval District on 12 December 1892. He remained in charge of reserve forces, and thus did not see any combat during the First Sino-Japanese War of 1895. He was commander-in-chief of the Kure Naval District from 26 February 1896 to 20 May 1900. In November 1900, he was awarded the Order of the Sacred Treasure, 1st class. Inoue was commander-in-chief of the Yokosuka Naval District from 20 May 1901 to 14 January 1905. He was promoted to admiral on 12 December 1901.  In November 1905, he was awarded the Grand Cordon of the Order of the Rising Sun.

After the Russo-Japanese War, Inoue was elevated to shishaku (viscount) on 21 September 1907, and to the largely ceremonial rank of Marshal Admiral  on his retirement on 31 October 1911. After retirement, Inoue continued to exert an influence on naval policy, and was a strong proponent of the occupation and annexation of the Caroline Islands during World War I

Inoue died in 1929. His grave is in his hometown of Kagoshima.

Decorations

Dates of rank
June 25, 1873 (Meiji 6) -- Junior Sixth Rank 
May 25, 1876 (Meiji 9) -- Sixth Rank 
October 28, 1886 (Meiji 19) -- Junior Fourth Rank 
February 13, 1892 (Meiji 25) -- Senior Fourth Rank 
September 20, 1898 (Meiji 31) -- Third rank 
December 27, 1901 (Meiji 34) -- Senior Third Rank 
February 1, 1907 (Meiji 40) -- Second rank 
February 20, 1914 (Taisho 3) -- Senior Second Rank 
March 22, 1929—Junior First Rank

Medals, etc.
November 19, 1885 -- The Order of the Rising Sun, Gold Rays
November 25, 1889 (Meiji 22) -- The Commemorative Medal for the Imperial Constitution Promulgation 
November 29, 1893 (Meiji 26) -- Order of the Sacred Treasure
1895 (Meiji 28)
November 18 (Meiji 278 -- Military Medal of Honor
November 21-- Order of the Rising Sun Shigemitsu
November 30, 1900 (Meiji 33) -- The Order of the Sacred Treasure
November 30, 1905 (Meiji 38) -- Grand Cordon of the Order of the Rising Sun
April 1, 1906 (Meiji 39) -- Order of the Golden Kite, Second Class
September 21, 1907 (Meiji 40) -- Viscount
October 31, 1911 (Meiji 44) -- Gensui Marshal, Marshal Emblem
1915 (Taisho 4)
November 7 -- A pair of gold cups, Military Medal of Honor in 1914 
November 10—Great Religion Memorial 
November 1, 1920 (Taisho 9) -- Asahi Sun Kirihana Daihosho, (Taisho 3rd to 9th year) Military Medal of Honor 
March 22, 1929 -- Grand Cordon of the Supreme Chrysanthemum

References

External links

|-

|-

Notes

1845 births
1929 deaths
People from Satsuma Domain
Samurai
People of Meiji-period Japan
People of the Boshin War
Japanese military personnel of the First Sino-Japanese War
Japanese military personnel of the Russo-Japanese War
Imperial Japanese Navy marshal admirals
Kazoku
Shimazu retainers
Recipients of the Order of the Rising Sun
Recipients of the Order of the Sacred Treasure
People from Kagoshima